Ratsada is a district (amphoe) in the northeastern part of Trang province, Thailand.

History 
The minor district (king amphoe) Ratsada was established on 1 April 1991 by splitting off five tambons from Huai Yot district. It was upgraded to a full district on 5 December 1996.

Geography 
Neighboring districts are (from the south clockwise): Huai Yot of Trang Province; Bang Khan and Thung Song of Nakhon Si Thammarat province.

Administration 
The district is divided into five sub-districts (tambons), which are further subdivided into 50 villages (mubans). Khlong Pang is a township (thesaban tambon) which covers parts of tambon Khlong Pang. There are a further five tambon administrative organizations (TAO).

Notable people
Oleydong Sithsamerchai: professional boxer

References

External links 
 (Thai)
amphoe.com

Districts of Trang province